Gaelic Symphony or Symphony in E minor, Op. 32 was written by Amy Marcy Cheney Beach in 1894; it was the first symphony composed and published by a female American composer.  The piece debuted in Boston on Friday, October 30, 1896 to "public and journalistic acclaim." Beach drew inspiration for the large orchestral work from simple old English, Irish, and Scottish melodies; thus, she subtitled the work 'Gaelic.'

History 

Beach began composing her symphony in November 1894.  Although Beach would later become more accepting of music from North American traditions—such as Native American themes—Beach chose to incorporate songs of the European influence into her early works.  One such (Celtic) tune was her song entitled, "Dark Is the Night!" which she set to the words of the English poet William Ernest Henley. She borrowed this song for her symphony.

Beach was heavily influenced by her contemporary Antonín Dvořák; naturally, she looked to Dvořák's compositions and publicized philosophies on American music while composing her symphony.   Though Dvořák's nationality was Czech, he was in the United States for much of 1892–1895 as head of the National Conservatory in New York. He represented American art music in the late nineteenth century—specifically through his New World Symphony and American String Quartet. Dvořák wove pentatonic scales from Native-American and African-American music and rhythms of slavic dances along with his European romantic style to create works unique to America—the melting pot.  The "native" elements were not as readily embraced by Beach.  Upon hearing of the derivations of Dvořák's New World Symphony, Beach heartily responded, "[w]e of the North should be far more likely to be influenced by old English, Scotch or Irish songs, inherited with our literature from our ancestors."  When her symphony premiered, Beach was barely 30 years old and in the throes of forming her own compositional style; in contrast, her later years brought maturity and an openness to infuse Native-American, specifically Inuit, and African-American songs into her music.

The work was published by Schmidt in 1897, and was dedicated to "herrn Capellmeister Emil Paur".

Structure 

In keeping with tradition passing through Haydn, Mozart, Beethoven, and Brahms, a symphony is divided into four contrasting movements.  The Gaelic Symphony is typically performed in thirty-five to forty minutes.  With a full romantic harmonic structure and a glimpse of the horizons of modern music, Beach's Gaelic Symphony set her apart as a prominent female composer at the turn of the twentieth century.

The four movements of the symphony are as follows:

I. Allegro con fuoco 
The symphony begins with a low chromatic rumble in the strings which provides the basis on which the romantic melody is built.  Rich orchestration establishes the romantic style of the symphony. Its unusual key choices mirror those in the first movement of Dvořák's New World Symphony.

II. Alla siciliana – allegro vivace 
The Gaelic themes are introduced in variation.

III. Lento con molto espressione 
The third movement is melodic and slow in nature.

IV. Allegro di molto 
The last movement of the symphony is brisk and thematic.

Reception and performances 
The Gaelic Symphony was well received.  Critic Philip Hale  "was generally enthusiastic about the work" although he "felt that Beach's orchestration was at times excessively heavy."  Composer George Whitefield Chadwick' wrote a letter to Beach: saying that he and Horatio Parker, a fellow member of the unofficial Second New England School of leading composers, had heard and liked the Gaelic Symphony,  and: "...I always feel a thrill of pride myself whenever I hear a fine work by any of us, and as such you will have to be counted in, whether you will or not—one of the boys."  Not long afterward Beach herself became recognized as one of the School, thereupon called the Boston Six.

The Symphony was "forgotten during the 1920s" but "made a comeback in the 1930s and 1940s," being performed by multiple orchestras, some multiple times each, although not by "major" orchestras such as the New York Philharmonic or Boston Symphony.

The symphony has received continued praise from modern critics as well, such as Andrew Achenbach of Gramophone, who in 2003 lauded the work for its "big heart, irresistible charm and confident progress."

References

Sources 
 Block, Adrienne Fried (1998). Amy Beach, Passionate Victorian: The Life and Work of an American Composer, Oxford University Press, New York
 Gates, Eugene, 2010, "Mrs. H.H.A. Beach, American Symphonist," The Kapralova Society Journal Vol. 8 No. 2, pp. 1–10

External links 
 
 

Compositions by Amy Beach
1894 compositions
American music
Romantic symphonies